Arantxa Rus (born 13 December 1990) is a Dutch tennis player. In 2008, she won the girl's singles title at the Australian Open, defeating Jessica Moore from Australia in the final. With this win she went from 35th to second place on the junior rankings, ultimately becoming the world No. 1 junior player.

Her biggest singles successes to date are a second-round upset over world No. 2, Kim Clijsters, at the 2011 French Open, saving two match points in the second set, reaching the fourth round at the 2012 French Open, and defeating world No. 5, Samantha Stosur, in the 2012 Wimbledon Championships to reach the third round. Her maiden WTA Tour title was winning the 2017 Swedish Open doubles event, partnering Quirine Lemoine.

Tennis career

2005–07
At age 14, Arantxa played her first ITF Women's Circuit tournament at Alkmaar where she lost in the second round to Julie Coin.

In 2006, she played two more ITF events at Heerhugowaard and Vlaardingen, reaching the semifinals at the latter.

In 2007, Rus continued playing on the ITF Circuit winning her first title at Vlaardingen and second at Alphen aan de Rijn. In San Luis Potosí, she reached the final, but lost in three sets.
In 's-Hertogenbosch, she was granted a wildcard to play her first WTA Tour main draw. She lost to Alona Bondarenko 1–6, 1–6 in the first round.

Her end-of-season 2007 ranking was 465.

2008: Turned pro
At the junior level, she won the Australian Open and reached the semifinals at Roland Garros and quarterfinals at Wimbledon.
In April, she won an ITF title in Bari beating four seeded players along the way, including Lucie Hradecká and Alberta Brianti.

Rus was given another wildcard to play at 's-Hertogenbosch, where she was defeated in the first round by Mariya Koryttseva.

In September, she played qualifications in Guangzhou winning both matches and reaching the main draw. In the first round, she beat Yanina Wickmayer in three sets. This was her first main-draw win on the WTA Tour. Rus reached the quarterfinals by beating Gisela Dulko. However, she lost to Camille Pin, in straight sets.

After qualifying, she reached the second round in Tashkent losing to top seed Peng Shuai, in two sets.
In Opole, she won another ITF tournament, her second in 2008, and fourth overall. 

She ended the year ranked 188.

2009

Rus failed at Hobart and Australian Open qualifying. Then she played some qualifying matches on few tournaments, but with no success. On the clay-court season, she found her game and in Marbella, she passed through the qualifying rounds, won in the first round, but lost to third seed Kaia Kanepi. A bigger result came at Roland Garros, where she started as world No. 142. She passed through the qualifying rounds, won her first-round match against Olivia Sanchez 6–1, 6–1 but then lost to Yaroslava Shvedova 0–6, 2–6. She played a few more tournaments without much success. Then, in the end of the season, she won ten of eleven matches. First, at ITF Poitiers, she passed through the qualifying rounds, won matches against third seed Alexandra Dulgheru and Séverine Beltrame before losing in the quarterfinals to Pauline Parmentier. Then she played at ITF Nantes where she won the title without dropping a set through the tournament, with a two-set victory against Renata Voráčová in the final. She ended the year with a win–loss record of 37–24.

2010
Rus failed at the qualifying rounds of the Hobart International and the Australian Open. She played few tournaments but her biggest result was in Marbella when she qualified to the first round. Then in Estoril she passed three qualifying round, won two matches in main draw but lost to Sorana Cîrstea. She lost at the US Open qualifying second round to Wimbledon junior champion Kristýna Plíšková, in three sets. She played at Koddaert Ladies Open. In the first round, she overcame eighth seed Tathiana Garbin, and in the second round was better than Michaëlla Krajicek. She lost in the quarterfinals to No. 2 seed Timea Bacsinszky, in two sets. Then she played qualifying at the Luxembourg Open, but she lost in first round to No. 5 seed Sorana Cîrstea, in three stes. Later, she played in the Real Tennis Masters Rotterdam final against Michaëlla Krajicek, but lost in straight sets. She ended the year with a win–loss record of 33–26.

2011

Her first tournament was the Brisbane International, where she played through the qualifying rounds. In the first round, she defeated Isabella Holland. In the second round, she defeated Olivia Rogowska but then lost to Anna Tatishvili in two sets. Rus next went through the qualifying rounds at the Sydney International. In the first round, she beat 1999 Wimbledon semifinalist Mirjana Lučić but in the second round, she lost against Bojana Jovanovski in a narrow three-setter.

In the first major event of the season, the Australian Open, Rus went through the qualifying rounds, as the No. 18 seed. In the first round, she defeated Julia Cohen. In the second, she again defeated Isabella Holland, and in the third qualifying round, Rus beat Kurumi Nara, also in straight sets. In her first Australian Open main-draw appearance, she defeated Bethanie Mattek-Sands, but she easily lost to No. 23 seed Svetlana Kuznetsova, in the second round.

Then, she played for the Netherlands Fed Cup Team at Group I of the European/African Zone. She won all of her singles matches against Hungary, Romania, and Latvia, helping the Netherlands with three victories. But they lost in the Promotional Play-off against Switzerland 2–1.

She played at ITF Stockholm, where she won the doubles title with Anastasiya Yakimova, and she lost the singles final from Kristina Mladenovic. She withdrew from WTA Monterrey because of illness. At Indian Wells, she played the qualifying but lost to Jamie Hampton, in three sets. Next was the Bahamas Open where she beat Jill Craybas and Kristina Barrois in the first two rounds. In the quarterfinals, she met her doubles partner, Anastasiya Yakimova, and lost in two sets. Then, she played qualifying matches for the Miami Open. In the first round, she defeated Japanese Misaki Doi and Michelle Larcher de Brito in the second qualifying round. In the main draw, she lost in the first round against Lourdes Domínguez Lino, in three sets.

Next was the Andalucia Tennis Experience, where she faced Dinara Safina in the first round, losing 6–3, 2–6, 4–6. She also lost in the first round at Fes in three sets to Aravane Rezaï. Then she played qualifying matches for the Portugal Open, beating Anne Kremer in the first round 6–0, 6–1, but losing against Sesil Karatancheva in three sets. She played the first round at the Madrid Open, losing against Maria Sharapova.

She continued on the ITF Circuit, first at Saint-Gaudens. In the first round, Rus beat Claire de Gubernatis 6–1, 6–1, and in the second round Séverine Beltrame 6–3, 6–3. In the quarterfinal, she beat former junior No. 1 Elina Svitolina in three, and in the semifinal Valeria Savinykh in two sets. She lost to Anastasia Pivovarova in the final in three sets. Then, she went on to the French Open and defeated Marina Erakovic in the first round. In the second round, she defeated the No. 2 seed Kim Clijsters 3–6, 7–5, 6–1, after saving two match points. She easily lost to Maria Kirilenko. Than she played at UNICEF Open where she defeated Indy de Vroome and CoCo Vandeweghe before she lost again to Svetlana Kuznetsova. In Wimbledon qualifying first round, she was better than Olivia Sanchez before she lost to Lindsay Lee-Waters, in second round. Then she played at the ITF Cuneo where she defeated Camilla Rosatello, Laura Pous Tió, Petra Martić and Mirjana Lučić but lost to Anna Tatishvili in the final. She was playing at ITF Contrexéville where as top seed she defeated Anna-Lena Grönefeld in the first round, Roxane Vaisemberg in the second, both in straight sets, but lost to Iryna Brémond in the quarterfinals. Then, she played ITF Astana where she defeated Zarina Diyas 6–7, 6–3, 7–6 in the first round; but in second round against Ekaterina Bychkova, she retired in the third set when Bychkova leading 2–0. After that, she had tough trainings until the US Open where she defeated Elena Vesnina 6–4, 6–2 but clearly lost to Caroline Wozniacki in the second round. After that, she played at the ITF Nigbo and lost to Xu Yifan in the second round. Then she had three first-round losses at Seoul (lost to Dulgheru), Pan Pacific open (to Pavlyuchenkova) and at qualifying first round in Linz (lost to Broady). Then she had huge break from tennis and played next tournament at ITF Dubai. She won matches against Erika Sema, Conny Perrin, and Akgul Amanmuradova before she lost to Kristina Mladenovic in the semifinals.

2012: Best season, French Open fourth round, career-high ranking
Started year at Brisbane, lost qualifying first-round match to Arantxa Parra Santonja and lost to Vania King in the same round at Sydney. In her second Australian Open main-draw appearance, she lost to Lesia Tsurenko, in two sets.

She missed Fed Cup matches due to a tooth infection, and then lost in Qatar qualifying first round against Caroline Garcia. She went on in Dubai and defeated Barbora Záhlavová-Strýcová in the qualifying first round, and Ons Jabeur in the second before she lost to Simona Halep in final qualifying round.

She went over to the Indian Wells Open but lost to Elena Baltacha in the first round. After that, she played an ITF tournament in Clearwater. She defeated Tetiana Luzhanska and Sachia Vickery before losing to Garbiñe Muguruza. She then headed over to the Miami Open, where she beat Caroline Garcia before she lost to Misaki Doi.

Then, on her first clay tournament of the year, The Oaks Club Challenger, she won her first title after ITF Nantes in 2009. She defeated Misaki Doi, Irina Falconi, Florencia Molinero, Edina Gallovits-Hall and in the final Sesil Karatantcheva. She played in Charleston and lost in the first round against Anna Tatishvili in three sets. In Brussels, she reached the second round after beating Zheng Jie, but had to retire because of a lower back injury in her second-round match against Sofia Arvidsson.

Rus entered Roland Garros main draw based on her ranking and reached the second round, after Jamie Hampton retired with Rus leading 6–4, 4–3. She then beat Virginie Razzano, who had a shock win over Serena Williams in the first round, in two sets. Subsequently, for the first time in her career, she reached the last 16 of a major tournament with a victory in three sets over 25th seed Julia Görges. She lost in the fourth round to 23rd seed Kaia Kanepi in three sets. Rus was the first Dutchwoman in 19 years to reach the fourth round in Paris (the last being Brenda Schultz-McCarthy in 1993).

She entered Wimbledon Championships and beat Misaki Doi in the first round. She then shocked fifth seeded Samantha Stosur 6–2, 0–6, 6–4 in the second. Rus lost in the third round to Peng Shuai in straight sets. It was her best Wimbledon result in her career. Afterwards, she reached semifinals at the $100k Biarritz tournament played on clay. Her last win at WTA-level was in Dallas, as she went on to lose in the first round at the US Open, Seoul, Linz and Luxembourg tournaments.

Rus finished the year ranked 68 in the world, her best year-end ranking.

2013

Losing to Olga Puchkova in the first round of Wimbledon was her 17th loss at the WTA level in a row, tying the longest losing streak in WTA history. She ended this streak in Bad Gastein, where she defeated María Teresa Torró Flor and Estrella Cabeza Candela in the first two rounds. In the quarterfinals, she lost to Yvonne Meusburger who then went on to win the tournament in her homeland. Rus stopped playing WTA tournaments and proceeded to have success in the ITF Circuit, winning four $25k singles titles on clay: at Fleurus, Alphen a/d Rijn, Vallduxo and Sant Cugat. She also won two doubles titles at Cagnes-sur-Mer and Taipei.

Her singles main-draw win/loss ratio was 2–13 for WTA and Grand Slam-level and 30–9 for ITF level.

Her end of the season ranking was 160.

2014
Her success in the ITF Circuit the previous year allowed her to play the qualifying rounds of the major tournaments, failing to win a match at the Australian Open, Wimbledon Championships and US Open. At the French Open, Rus beat Lyudmyla Kichenok in the first qualifying round, but lost to Timea Bacsinszky in the second round. She failed to qualify for several WTA tournaments: Brisbane, Florianopolis, Katowice Open, Ricoh Open and Bastad.

At the Fed Cup World Group II playoffs, Rus played two singles matches for the Netherlands, beating world No. 100, Kurumi Nara, and losing to Misaki Doi, in three sets, ultimately the Netherlands beat Japan with a score of 3-2.

Rus didn't reach a singles final at the ITF level that year, but she had success on clay again, reaching the semifinals of four $25k tournaments played in Chiasso, Wiesbaden, Brescia and Dobrich. She won a doubles title alongside Demi Schuurs, at Fleurus.

With an overall 21-16 win/loss ratio at ITF level, Rus finished the year ranked 230 in the singles rankings.

2015
In February, playing on indoor clay, the Netherlands faced Slovakia at the Fed Cup World Group II tie. There, Rus scored wins against two top-100 players Magdaléna Rybáriková and Anna Karolína Schmiedlová. The Netherlands went on to win the tie 4-1 and moved on to the World Group playoffs. Playing the World Group playoffs against Australia and on indoor clay again, Rus, ranked 217th in the world, lost her first match against Casey Dellacqua, but beat 48th-ranked Jarmila Gajdosova in a 0–6, 7–5, 7–5 match, ultimately helping the Netherlands get the win and a pass to the Fed Cup World Group for the first time since 1998. As a result of her performance, she was nominated for a Heart Award by the Fed Cup, ultimately losing to Romania's Irina-Camelia Begu.

Rus had little success on the ITF Circuit. In January, she reached the semifinals of a $25k tournament in Daytona Beach, losing to Elise Mertens. In June, she reached the final of a $15k tournament in Zeeland, Netherlands, losing to Quirine Lemoine. In August, she lost to Kiki Bertens in the semifinals of a $25k tournament in Koksijde, Belgium. Rus reached three doubles finals, two alongside Lesley Kerkhove and one with Elise Mertens. She had a 23-24 singles win/loss ratio this year at the ITF Circuit, not counting qualifying matches.

She finished season as No. 289 in singles, her lowest year-end ranking since 2007.

2016
Rus's low ranking meant she had to qualify for several ITF tournaments, successfully doing so seven times out of seven throughout the season. In February, she played on indoor carpet at $25k Altenkirchen, Germany, winning two qualifying rounds to enter the main draw, and winning another four matches to reach the final where she lost to Ysaline Bonaventure. In July, she reached the semifinals of a $50k clay-court tournament in Rome where she lost to Laura Pous-Tio. Rus reached the semifinals of another two $25k tournaments, both played on outdoor clay, in Aschaffenburg (where she had to win three qualifying rounds) and Leipzig, losing both times at that stage. In October, she won back to back $25k titles in Thailand and France. Rus reached the singles quarterfinals or better at eleven ITF tournaments this year. She also won three doubles titles.

Rus won 39 singles matches on the ITF Circuit, and with a 39-21 win/loss ratio she finished the year in the top 200 for the first time since 2013, as the 174th singles player in the rankings, moving 115 spots up from the previous year.

2017: First WTA doubles title and WTA 125 singles final
For the first time since 2014, Rus played the qualifying rounds of a major, at the Australian Open, losing in the first round to Romanian Ana Bogdan in three sets. In March, she reached the quarterfinals of a $60k hardcourt tournament in Zhuhai, China.

She played doubles for the Netherlands in Fed Cup, pairing Cindy Burger. Both times they played, it was a dead rubber. Netherlands lost their first round in the World Group to Belarus, but beat Slovakia in the playoffs, staying in the World Group for 2018.

Rus went on a three-match losing streak, which included a qualifying round at the Morocco Open. She broke this streak at the singles qualifying for the French Open, where she won her first two matches against Viktoriya Tomova and Antonia Lottner. She lost the last qualifying match against compatriot Quirine Lemoine in three sets, despite having a match point.

Rus received a wildcard for the Rosmalen Championships, a WTA tournament hosted in her homeland. This was her first grass-court tournament since 2014. In the first round, she upset 36-ranked Timea Babos in a three setter. She won her second-round match against Andrea Hlaváčková, in straight sets. In the quarterfinals, she lost to eventual runner-up Natalia Vikhlyantseva, in straight sets. This performance marked Rus's first wins at WTA-level since the 2013 Gastein Ladies where she also reached the quarterfinals. This also marked the first time Rus won a main-draw grass-court match since the 2012 Wimbledon Championships. As a result, she moved up 25 spots in the WTA rankings from world No. 183 to No. 158, her highest ranking in almost three years.

She won her first WTA title in the Swedish Open at Båstad, partnering Quirine Lemoine. In the on-court television interview after the win Lemoine explained that it was even more special because the two had been friends since they were ten years old.

2018: Back to Grand Slams

2019: Record 10 ITF titles in a calendar year
After winning the W25 Orlando in Florida in November, Arantxa Rus created history by claiming her tenth ITF singles title of the year, the most in any one calendar year for men or women.

2020-22: Three WTA doubles & two WTA 125 singles finals, return to top 100

Performance timelines

Only main-draw results in WTA Tour, Grand Slam tournaments, Fed Cup/Billie Jean King Cup and Olympic Games are included in win–loss records.

Singles
Current after the 2023 Indian Wells Open.

Doubles

WTA career finals

Doubles: 6 (4 titles, 2 runner-ups)

WTA Challenger finals

Singles: 3 (3 runner–ups)

Doubles: 1 (runner-up)

ITF Circuit finals

Singles: 44 (30 titles, 14 runner–ups)

Doubles: 29 (12 titles, 17 runner–ups)

Junior Grand Slam tournament finals

Girls' singles: 1 title

Top 10 wins

Notes

References

External links

 
 
 

1990 births
Living people
Dutch female tennis players
Australian Open (tennis) junior champions
People from Monster
Sportspeople from Delft
Grand Slam (tennis) champions in girls' singles
20th-century Dutch women
20th-century Dutch people
21st-century Dutch women